Agnes of Assisi (1197 or 1198 – 16 November 1253) was a younger sister of Clare of Assisi and one of the first abbesses of the Order of Poor Ladies (now the Poor Clares). Pope Benedict XIV canonized her as a saint in 1753.

Life
She was a younger daughter of Count Favorino Scifi. Her birth name was probably Caterina; she took the name of Agnes when she became a nun. Her mother, Ortolana, who also would join the order founded by her daughters, belonged to the noble family of the Fiumi. Their cousin Rufino Scifi was one of the original "Three Companions" of Francis of Assisi. Agnes spent her childhood between her father's palace in the city and his castle of Sasso Rosso on Mount Subasio.

On 18 March 1212, her eldest sister Clare, inspired by the example of Francis of Assisi, left their father's home in secret to become a follower of Francis. Sixteen days later, Agnes ran off to the Church of St. Angelo di Panzo where Francis had brought her sister, resolved to share Clare's life of poverty and penance. Angry at the loss of two of his daughters, their father sent his brother Monaldo and several relatives and armed followers to the monastery to force Agnes, if persuasion failed, to return home.

Monaldo drew his sword to strike his niece, but his arm allegedly dropped to his side, withered and useless. The others dragged Agnes out of the monastery by her hair, striking and kicking her repeatedly. Agnes' body reportedly became so heavy, perhaps due to the help of her sister, that her assailants dropped her in a field nearby. Agnes' relatives, purportedly realizing that something divine protected her, allowed the sisters to remain together. Francis himself cut her hair and gave her the religious habit, in recognition of Agnes' dedication.

Francis later established a cloister for Clare and Agnes at the rural chapel of San Damiano, where they were soon joined by other noblewomen of the city, and the Order of Poor Ladies, later known as the Poor Clares, began, with Clare as its abbess. In 1221, a group of Benedictine nuns in Monticelli near Florence asked to become Poor Ladies. Agnes was chosen to lead the new community. Although life in the Florentine convent was harmonious and without faction, she missed her sister greatly.

She later went on to establish other communities of the order, including those of Mantua, Venice, and Padua. Agnes was said to be very virtuous, and as abbess she ruled with a benevolent kindness, knowing how to make the practice of virtue appealing to her sisters.

In 1253, Agnes returned to Assisi to nurse her sister Clare during the latter's illness, and shortly thereafter died herself, on 16 November 1253. Her remains were interred with those of her sister at the Basilica of St. Clare at Assisi.

Agnes' feast day is the anniversary of her death, 16 November. She was canonized in 1753, the year of her 500th anniversary, by Pope Benedict XIV.

Notes

References
 Bartoli, Marco. Chiara d'Assisi. Rome 1989: Instituto Storico dei Cappucini.

People from Assisi
1190s births
1253 deaths
13th-century Christian saints
13th-century Italian Roman Catholic religious sisters and nuns
Medieval Italian saints
Poor Clare abbesses
Franciscan saints
Italian Roman Catholic abbesses
Italian Roman Catholic saints
Female saints of medieval Italy
Canonizations by Pope Benedict XIV